The 2005 Mr. Olympia contest was an IFBB professional bodybuilding competition and the feature event of Joe Weider's 2005 Olympia Weekend held October 15–16, 2005 at the Orleans Arena in Las Vegas, Nevada.

Results

The total prize amount given during the exhibition was $711,000, an increase of 32% from  2004. The total prize money for the men's Mr. Olympia was $550,000.

Notable events

Ronnie Coleman wins his eighth consecutive Mr. Olympia title, tying with Lee Haney for most wins
Gustavo Badell won $50,000 in the Challenge Round.
Jay Cutler won $10,000 in the Vyo Tech's Best Wheels.

See also
 2005 Ms. Olympia

References

External links 
 Mr. Olympia

 2005
Mr. Olympia
Mr. Olympia 2005
2005 in bodybuilding
Mr. Olympia 2005